Life Will See You Now is the fourth studio album by Swedish indie pop musician Jens Lekman. The album was released on 17 February 2017 through Secretly Canadian.

The album's title and release date were first announced on 4 January 2017, accompanied by the release of its lead single, "What's That Perfume That You Wear?" A second song, "Evening Prayer", was released on 7 February.

Background
Lekman had finished a follow-up record to his third studio album I Know What Love Isn't in 2014, but scrapped it after he felt that the finished product "sounded like [he] had given up". The following year, he launched a project he entitled Postcards, which saw him writing and releasing a new song each week of the year, and his more freeform approach to songwriting on Postcards carried over to the making of Life Will See You Now. In an interview about the making of the album, Lekman said: "I wanted it to be a pop record... I Know What Love Isn't was almost an extreme narrowing of the palette I was using, but for this one I wanted it to be more colorful. I wanted there to be more instruments. I was learning about drum machines and electronic instruments when I was making this."

Critical reception

Life Will See You Now received highly positive reviews from music critics. At Metacritic, which assigns a normalized rating out of 100 to reviews from mainstream critics, the album received an average score of 83, based on 23 reviews, which indicates "universal acclaim".

Accolades

Track listing

Sample credits
"What's That Perfume That You Wear?" contains samples of "The Path", written by Ralph MacDonald, William Eaton, and William Salter, and performed by Ralph MacDonald.
"How We Met, The Long Version" contains samples of "Don't Stop Dancin'", written by Alvin Stewart and performed by Jackie Stoudemire.

Personnel
Credits for Life Will See You Now adapted from liner notes.

Jens Lekman – vocals, handclapping, piano, writing, production

Additional personnel

Madelene Birgenius – piano
Matt Colton – mastering
Henri Davies – recording (assistant)
Alex de Little – trombone
Alice Dixon – strings
Anna Eichholz – strings
Linnéa Eketrä – accordion
Josa Gerhard – strings
Ellika Henrikson – photography
Ellen Hjalmarsson – strings
Emelie Jonazon – saxophone
Paul B. Keeves – bass
Loulou Lamotte – vocals, background vocals
Kristin Lidell – trumpet
Sasse Lindblad – mixing
Malin Nordström – composition
Jonas Odhner – engineering (horns)
Ewan Pearson – engineering, handclapping, mixing, production, recording, programming, Solina
Dominik Petzold – piano
Guy Sternberg – engineering, recording
Jackie Stoudemire – sampling
Tracey Thorn – composition, vocals
Nathaniel David Utesch – layout
 – artwork
Nicolai Ziel – drums, percussion

Charts

References

2017 albums
Albums produced by Ewan Pearson
Jens Lekman albums
Secretly Canadian albums